Pavla Vošahlíková (born 20 March 1951 in Prague) is a Czech historian. Her specialization is the history of Czech in 19th and the first half of the 20th century. In 1974 she defended her PhD thesis on the Charles University in Prague. She is member of the Department of Biographical Studies of the Institute of History of the Czech Academy of Sciences.

Pavla Vošahlíková was an editor of Biografický slovník českých zemí from 2004 to 2012. She is member of the editorial board of Polski Słownik Biograficzny.

She collaborates with the Czech Radio.

Works 
 Slovenské politické směry v období přechodu k imperiaIismu. Praha : Academia, 1979.
 Československá sociální demokracie a Národní fronta. Praha : Academia, 1985.
 Jak se žilo za časů Františka Josefa I. Praha : Svoboda, 1996.
 Zlaté časy reklamy. Praha : Karolinum, 1999.
 Cesty k samostatnosti. Portréty žen v éře modernizace. Praha : Historický ústav, 2010. (co-author)

Footnotes

References 
PÁNEK, Jaroslav; VOREL, Petr, a kol. Lexikon současných českých historiků. Praha ; Pardubice : Historický ústav Akademie věd České republiky : Sdružení historiků České republiky (Historický klub) ; Východočeské muzeum, 1999. 373 s.

External links 
Profil on the website of the Academy of Sciences of the Czech Republic
Bibliography of most important works of Pavla Vošahlíková

Czech women historians
1951 births
Living people
20th-century Czech historians
21st-century Czech historians
Charles University alumni